Sarrud-e Shomali Rural District is a rural district (dehestan) in the Central District of Boyer-Ahmad County, Kohgiluyeh and Boyer-Ahmad Province, Iran. At the 2006 census, its population was 25,908, in 5,303 families. The rural district has 25 villages.

References 

Rural Districts of Kohgiluyeh and Boyer-Ahmad Province
Boyer-Ahmad County